Sunset Peak may refer to:

 Sunset Peak (Absaroka Range) in Montana, United States
 Sunset Peak (Alaska) in Alaska, United States
 Sunset Peak (Hong Kong)
 Sunset Peak (Jammu and Kashmir) in Jammu and Kashmir
 Sunset Peak (New Brunswick) in New Brunswick, Canada
 Sunset Peak (Snowcrest Range) in Montana, United States